Lieutenant General Eugène De Greef (31 August 1900 – 14 February 1995) was a Belgian Minister of Defence, serving under two successive Belgian prime ministers (first Pholien, then Van Houtte) between 1950 and 1954. His tenure coincided with Belgian intervention in the Korean War, as well as important negotiations about the European Defence Community.

Background and career

De Greef was from a Walloon family

De Greef and the Korean War

Though De Greef was not the minister who took the decision to send Belgian soldiers to the UN mission in Korea, he held office through the entire duration of the conflict.

De Greef's predecessor (Henri Moreau de Melen of the Christian Social Party) resigned his tenure early to volunteer to serve in Korea. De Greef's own son, Captain Guy de Greef (described as "a superb officer") commanded C Company of the Belgian Volunteer Corps in Korea in 1953, at the Battle of Chatkol.

Other events
De Greef was involved in the negotiations of the European Defence Community and North Atlantic Treaty Organization.

Under De Greef, Belgium promised to contribute 12 soldiers out of every 1,000 inhabitants. Compulsory military training was increased to two years from one and total army strength increased to 150,000 men.

References

External links
 Cabinet of the Pholien Government, 1950-1952
 A. Maurits van der Veen, Defending Integration or Integrating Defence? Ratifying the EDC in Belgium and the Netherlands, University of Georgia (2009) - Negotiations in which De Greef took part

Belgian Ministers of Defence
1900 births
1995 deaths